Robert H. McLaughlin (1877-1939) was a novelist,  playwright, theater manager, publicist, and screenwriter in the United States.

He edited the Clipper newspaper in 1907.

He led Cleveland's Success Film Company. He planned to use an Educational Film Company studio in Cleveland. He was also involved in another planned film company in Cleveland.

Novels
The Great Chadwick Bubble

Theater
Silas Marner (1910), a dramatization of George Eliot's novel
The Sixth Commandment  (1910)
Demi-Tasse (1913)
Pearl of Great Price
The Eternal Magdalene (1915)
Fires of Spring (1919)Decameron Night (1922) adapted from Boccaccio's Decameron

FilmographyThe Eternal Magdalene'' (1919), adapted from his play of the same name

References

20th-century American dramatists and playwrights
Businesspeople from Cleveland
1877 births
1939 deaths
Novelists from Ohio
Editors of Ohio newspapers
20th-century American novelists
20th-century American newspaper editors
Screenwriters from Ohio
American theatre managers and producers
American male screenwriters
Writers from Cleveland
American film studio executives
20th-century American businesspeople